Tatiana Korshunova (born March 6, 1956 in Ramenskoye, Moscow Oblast) is a Soviet sprint canoer who competed in the mid to late 1970s. She won a silver medal in the K-1 500 m event at the 1976 Summer Olympics in Montreal.

Korshunova also won four medals at the ICF Canoe Sprint World Championships with two silvers (K-4 500 m: 1974, 1979) and two bronzes (K-1 500 m and K-4 500 m: both 1977).

References

Sports-reference.com profile

1956 births
Living people
People from Ramensky District
Canoeists at the 1976 Summer Olympics
Olympic canoeists of the Soviet Union
Olympic silver medalists for the Soviet Union
Soviet female canoeists
Olympic medalists in canoeing
Russian female canoeists
ICF Canoe Sprint World Championships medalists in kayak
Medalists at the 1976 Summer Olympics
Sportspeople from Moscow Oblast